Robin Schouten (born 25 February 1998) is a Dutch football player who currently plays for De Graafschap, on loan from Danish Superliga club SønderjyskE.

Club career
He made his Eerste Divisie debut for Jong Ajax on 18 August 2017 in a game against SC Cambuur.

He moved to NAC Breda in July 2019. After two years, Schouten moved to Denmark and joined Danish Superliga club SønderjyskE on 25 August 2021, signing a deal until June 2024. On 20 June 2022, Schouten returned to his homeland, as he signed a one-year loan deal with De Graafschap.

References

External links
 
 

1998 births
Sportspeople from Alkmaar
Living people
Dutch footballers
Dutch expatriate footballers
Netherlands youth international footballers
Jong AZ players
Jong Ajax players
FC Volendam players
NAC Breda players
SønderjyskE Fodbold players
De Graafschap players
Tweede Divisie players
Eerste Divisie players
Danish Superliga players
Association football defenders
Dutch expatriate sportspeople in Denmark
Expatriate men's footballers in Denmark
Footballers from North Holland